Vastseliina is a small borough in Võru Parish, Võru County in southeastern Estonia.

Vastseliina is the birthplace of wrestler and 1924 Olympic Gold Medalist Eduard Pütsep and writer and lawyer Uido Truija.

See also
Vastseliina Castle

References

Boroughs and small boroughs in Estonia
Võru Parish
Kreis Werro